Patrick Amoako Nuamah (born 31 December 2005) is an Italian professional footballer who plays as a midfielder for  club Brescia.

Club career 
Born in Brescia to Ghanaian parents, Nuamah started playing football in the youth sector of the city's local football team. At Brescia, he progressed through the youth ranks before signing his first professional contract with the club in July 2022, penning a three-year deal.

After being promoted to Brescia's first team in the same summer, under head coach Pep Clotet, Nuamah made his professional debut on 3 September 2022, coming in as a substitute for Stefano Moreo in the 83rd minute of a Serie B match against Perugia, which ended in a 2–1 win for his side. At 16 years and 243 days, he became the club's third youngest ever player.

International career 
Nuamah can choose to represent either Italy or Ghana at international level.

Having previously took part in training camps with the Italian under-15 and under-16 national teams, he then went on to feature for the under-18 national team.

Style of play 
Nuamah is a central midfielder, who mainly plays in the holding role, but can also act as a mezzala. Ambidextrous and composed on the ball, he has also been regarded for his passing prowess, his physique, his pace and his leadership skills.

He has pointed at Paul Pogba and Stephen Appiah as his biggest sources of inspiration.

Career statistics

References

External links 
 
 

2005 births
Living people
Footballers from Brescia
Italian footballers
Italy youth international footballers
Italian people of Ghanaian descent
Association football midfielders
Serie B players
Brescia Calcio players
Sportspeople from Brescia